Koryo Songgyungwan University (고려성균관) or University of Light Industry is an educational institution in North Korean city of Kaesong. The university was founded in 992 with the name Kukchagam. It was renamed Songgyungam in 1298 and Songgyungwan in 1308.

See also 
 List of universities in North Korea

References

992 establishments
Educational institutions established in the 10th century
Universities in North Korea
10th-century establishments in Korea